Rei do Mate is a Brazilian fast food chain of tea house stores.

The chain was founded in 1978 as a small shop next to the São João and Ipiranga avenue, in the city of São Paulo. Currently, 280 stores are spread across 17 states of Brazil, offering more than 100 combinations of mate tea, hot drinks like cappuccinos and also healthy snacks.

References

External links
 Official website 

Tea houses
Fast-food chains of Brazil
Companies based in São Paulo
Restaurants established in 1978
Brazilian brands